Hamarøy is a municipality in Nordland county, Norway. It is part of the traditional district of Salten. The administrative centre of the municipality is the village of Oppeid. Other villages include Drag, Innhavet, Karlsøy, Korsnes, Presteid, Skutvika, Tømmerneset, Tranøy, and Ulvsvåg.

The  municipality is the 36th largest by area out of the 356 municipalities in Norway. Hamarøy is the 242nd most populous municipality in Norway with a population of 2,708.

General information
The municipality of Hamarøy was established on 1 January 1838 (see formannskapsdistrikt law). During the 1960s, there were many municipal mergers across Norway due to the work of the Schei Committee. On 1 January 1964, the part of Hamarøy located on the south side of the Sagfjorden and west of the Veggfjellan mountain (population: 77) was transferred to neighboring Steigen Municipality. On the same date, the Tysnes and Molvik farms (population: 33) was transferred from Hamarøy to the neighboring Tysfjord Municipality.

On 1 January 2020, the western part of Tysfjord Municipality was merged into Hamarøy. This occurred because in 2017, it was decided by the Parliament of Norway that the neighboring Tysfjord Municipality would be divided along the Tysfjorden with the eastern half being merged with the neighboring municipalities of Narvik and Ballangen to form a new, larger Narvik Municipality and the remaining western half will be merged with the municipality of Hamarøy on the same date.

Name
The municipality is named after the former island (now peninsula) Hamarøya since the first Hamarøy Church was built there. The first element is the genitive case of the former uncompounded name of the island , which means "thigh/leg (of an animal)" because the island (or a part of it) was shaped in the form of an animal's leg. Historically, the municipality name was spelled Hammerø.

Coat of arms
The current coat of arms was adopted in 2019 for use starting on 1 January 2020 after a municipal merger. The blazon is "Azure, a rock carving of two swans argent". This means the arms have a blue field (background) and the charge is a depiction of a 9,000-year-old rock carving of the outlines of two swans. The swans have a tincture of argent which means they are commonly colored white, but if it is made out of metal, then silver is used. The ancient rock carving seen at Dyreberget in Leiknes is a notable historical feature for the municipality. The two swans also symbolize the two cultures of the municipality: Norwegian and Lule Sami. The arms were designed by Ingar Nikolaisen Kuoljok and Dag Winsjansen.

The former coat of arms was granted on 19 February 1982 and in use until 1 January 2020 when the new arms were put into use. The official blazon is "Azure, a lynx statant guardant argent". This means the arms have a blue field (background) and the charge is a lynx. The lynx has a tincture of argent which means it is commonly colored white, but if it is made out of metal, then silver is used. Lynx are common in the area it was chosen for the arms as a symbol for the rich wildlife in the forests of the municipality. The arms were designed by Asbjørn Mathiassen.

Churches
The Church of Norway has two parishes within the municipality of Hamarøy. It is part of the Ofoten prosti (deanery) in the Diocese of Sør-Hålogaland.

Geography

The municipality of Hamarøy borders the municipalities of Narvik to the north, Steigen to the west, Sørfold to the south, the Vestfjorden to the northwest, and the country of Sweden to the southeast. The large island of Finnøya is located between the Sagfjorden and the Kaldvågfjorden.

Lakes in the municipality include Fjerdvatnet, Forsanvatnet, Forsvatnet, Kaldvågvatnet, Kilvatnet, Livsejávrre, Makkvatnet, Reinoksvatnet, Rekvatnet, Rotvatnet, Sandnesvatnet, Skilvatnet, Šluŋkkajávri, and Strindvatnet.

Nature
Hamarøy is dominated by small fjords, pine, birch, and aspen woodland and forest, and coastal mountains. There are several nature reserves, such as Trollpollen nature reserve dominated by pine and birch located a few kilometers north of Innhavet, Lilandsvatnet wetland area, Steinslandsosen estuary,  and Kvannskogen with old aspen trees with rich lichen flora. The mountain Hamarøyskaftet has long been regarded as nature's own phallic symbol (See picture 1 and  picture 2).

Climate
Hamarøy has an oceanic or boreal climate, depending on winter threshold used ( or ). The wettest season is autumn and early winter, while April - June is the driest, indicating an oceanic climate. The record high is  recorded 18 July 2018 at Drag.

Government
All municipalities in Norway, including Hamarøy, are responsible for primary education (through 10th grade), outpatient health services, senior citizen services, unemployment and other social services, zoning, economic development, and municipal roads. The municipality is governed by a municipal council of elected representatives, which in turn elect a mayor.  The municipality falls under the Ofoten District Court and the Hålogaland Court of Appeal.

Municipal council
The municipal council of Hamarøy is made up of 17 representatives that are elected to four year terms. The party breakdown of the council is as follows:

Mayors
The mayors of Hamarøy (incomplete list):

1838-18??: Truls Krog Koch
1857-1864: Nikolai Walsøe
1880-1886: Olaus Holter
1910-1919: Johan Hoff Ellingsen (V)
1919-1937: Konrad Halmøy (V)
1937-1942: Sverre Pedersen 
1942-1943: Sverre Vaag
1943-1945: Sverre Pedersen 
1945-1945: Bjarne Gaarder
1945-1946: Jonathan Vardevik 
1946-1947: Johan Stokland 
1947-1955: Arthur Thoresen (Ap)
1955-1959: Petter Fikke (LL)
1959-1967: Ulrik Normann (H)
1967-1983: Olav Elsbak, Jr. (H)
1983-1991: Ingvald Sørensen (Ap)
1991-1995: Sverre Harald Eriksen (Sp)
1995-2003: May Valle (V)
2003-2007: Jan-Folke Sandnes (H)
2007-2015: Rolf Steffensen (Ap)
2015-2019: Jan-Folke Sandnes (H)
2019–present: Britt Kristoffersen (Sp)

Transportation

While Hamarøy has a low population density, it sees some traffic during the summer months as the main road connection to Svolvær and the Lofoten islands runs through Hamarøy and its administrative centre, Oppeid. The ferry ride to Skrova and Svolvær is approximately 2 hours and departs from Skutvika (approximately 15 minutes from Oppeid) at regular intervals. In 2008, the ferry schedule was considerably reduced due to the new Lofoten Mainland Connection road. The European route E6 highway runs north and south through the municipality on its way to Narvik. Bus service by Stoklands Bilruter is available between certain villages in Hamarøy.

Economy

The municipal administration and other public services are located in Oppeid. There is a hotel in the municipality, as well as the scenic Tranøy Lighthouse which can be rented.

Skutvik is a small residential and marina area concentrated around the ferry dock. In the high season the number of cars and motor homes in line for the ferry can be significant. There are a few sights to see in Skutvik, as well as a small bar/cafe and a Statoil gas station.

Knut Hamsun

The writer Knut Hamsun, winner of the 1920 Nobel Prize in Literature, grew up in Hamarøy. The Knut Hamsun Centre, a museum and educational center dedicated to Knut Hamsun's life and work, finished building in 2009 and opened for the public in June 2010. Knut Hamsun's childhood home is also open for visitors in summer. The Hamsun literature festival was founded in 1982 and takes place in Hamarøy during the first week of August every second year.

Notable people 

 Knut Hamsun (1859–1952) a Norwegian writer, winner of the Nobel Prize in Literature in 1920, brought up in Hamarøy
 Sigurd Johan Normann (1879 in Hamarøy — 1939) a Norwegian theologian, Bishop for the Diocese of Hålogaland in Tromsø, 1937 to 1939.
 Tore Hamsun (1912 in Hamarøy – 1995) a Norwegian painter, writer and publisher
 Horst Tappert (1923–2008) a German movie and TV actor, had a summer holiday cabin in Hamarøy 
 Jack Berntsen (1940–2010) a Norwegian philologist, songwriter and folk singer, grew up in Hamarøy

References

External links
Municipal fact sheet from Statistics Norway 

The Knut Hamsun Centre
The Knut Hamsun Centre's architecture

 
Municipalities of Nordland
1838 establishments in Norway
Populated places of Arctic Norway
Sámi-language municipalities